Vivek Gupta (born December 1975) is MLA from Assembly Constituency Jorasakho of Trinamool Congress Party in West Bengal Election 2021. He was previously a Member of Parliament Rajya Sabha (2012- 2018) representing All India Trinamool Congress Rajya Sabha members from West Bengal. He is the Managing Director & Chief group editor of SANMARG which is the leading Hindi daily in Eastern India. He is also state president of Trinamool Congress Hindi Cell West Bengal unit from 15 January 2023 .

Early life
Vivek Gupta was born in Kolkata to a Hindu family. He went to Don Bosco School Calcutta and later to Bhawanipore College in Kolkata. He began his career as a journalist. 

He is educated at Calcutta University with B.com (Hons), a Degree in System Design & Analyst from Kolkata NIIT and degree in Print Production Education at V.D.M.A (Germany).

Political career
He was nominated in the year May 2012 to Rajya Sabha from West Bengal.
He has served as a member of Department Related Parliamentary Standing Committees (LS) committee on food, consumer affair & Public Distribution in the year 2012.
He was a member of Department Related Parliamentary Standing Committees (RS) committee on Industry. He is since December 2012 onwards Member of the Indian Institute of Science Education and Research (IISERs) Council and since October 2013 onwards Member, National Platform for Disaster Risk Reduction.

He participated in the World Earth Summit in 2012, and in the 9th World Hindi Conference in Johannesburg 2012.

He was Member Hindi Advisory Committee of West Bengal during 2010–2012. He was President of Paschim Banga Hindi Academy during 2011–2012.

References

1975 births
Living people
Trinamool Congress politicians from West Bengal
Rajya Sabha members from West Bengal
Politicians from Kolkata
University of Calcutta alumni
21st-century Indian politicians